Jonathan Kydd is the name of:
Jonathan Kydd (academic) (born 1951), British leading expert in Agricultural Development Economics
Jonathan Kydd (actor) (born 1956), British actor